Group J of the 2014–15 EuroChallenge was the third group of the Last 16 phase. It consisted of SPM Shoeters Den Bosch, Tartu University Rock, Avtodor Saratov, and Fraport Skyliners. Play began on 13 January 2015 and ended 24 February.

Standings

References

Group K
2014–15 in German basketball
2014–15 in Russian basketball
2014–15 in Estonian basketball
2014–15 in Dutch basketball